Big Pile of Mud is an LP release by the Canadian garage-rock band Deja Voodoo. It would be their last release recorded in a studio.

There is a Greek version released by Didi Records that includes two bonus tracks: "Waiting for the Man," a Velvet Underground cover, and "I Wish That Cat Would Shut Up."

Production
The band recorded the album for less than $150.

Critical reception
AllMusic wrote that "there is more of a relaxed feel on this album ... On the opening track, Gerard Van Herk sings about his girlfriend in true sludgebilly style, and elsewhere cuts down people who wear brown leather jackets or charge exorbitant prices for import albums."

Track listing
My Girlfriend
Big Pile of Mud
Call Link Wray
(Some Things Just Don't) Wash Off
Monsters in My Garage Got Married
Gonna Kill Somebody
Stuff and Things
Brown Leather Jacket
A Million Pieces
Big Ending!
48 Bucks
Yeye
Dodge Veg-o-matic
Beat Me to the Lunch
Red Garlic Shoes
Weird World
Espresso Bongo
Polk Salad Annie

Personnel
 Tony Dewald, drums
 Gerard van Herk, guitar/voice

References

1988 albums
Deja Voodoo (Canadian band) albums
Og Music albums